KJMB-FM (100.3 FM) is a commercial radio station that is licensed to Blythe, California, United States. The station is owned by James M. Morris and broadcasts an adult contemporary format.

History
The station first signed on as KYOR-FM on July 30, 1980. It was a continuation of KYOR, a now-defunct station that operated at 1200 AM from 1945 to 1979. The call sign changed to KJMB on February 15, 1981, then to KJMB-FM on May 11, 1983.

In September 2010, James S. Mayson sold KJMB-FM to station manager James M. Morris for $150,000.

References

External links

JMB-FM
Mainstream adult contemporary radio stations in the United States
Radio stations established in 1980
Blythe, California
Mass media in Riverside County, California